William J. Gallant (March 31, 1913 – January 30, 1964) was a Canadian politician. He served in the Legislative Assembly of New Brunswick from 1952 to 1960 as member of the Liberal party.

References

1913 births
1964 deaths
New Brunswick Liberal Association MLAs